The Last Bastion is a television mini-series which aired in Australia in November 1984.  It is a docudrama telling the story of Australia's involvement in World War II, and its often strained relations with its two main allies, Great Britain and the United States.

The running time of the series is reported as 360 minutes (6 hours) on the IMDb page, that is the screening time with ads. Each part runs for approx 90 minutes, both on VHS tape and DVD, is approximately 160 minutes implying they are heavily edited versions, as they've compressed 3 episodes into one 2 hour 40 minute film.

The 3 episodes still remain in the Screensound Archive.

Cast
 Michael Blakemore ... John Curtin
 John Wood ... Robert Menzies
 Timothy West ... Winston Churchill
 Robert Vaughn ... General Douglas MacArthur
 Warren Mitchell ... Franklin D. Roosevelt
 Ray Barrett ... General Thomas Blamey
 Peter Whitford ... H. V. "Bert" Evatt
 Max Cullen ... Eddie Ward
Jon Ewing ... Billy Hughes
Nancye Hayes ... Elsie Curtin
Neil Fitzpatrick ... Frederick Shedden
 Bill Hunter ... Ben Chifley
Reg Gillam ... General George C. Marshall

Production
The series was the result of two years work for Williamson. It was his first work for television and his first effort as producer.

Kristian Williamson helped with the research and wrote a book with the same title.

References

External links
The Last Bastion at IMDb

1984 films
Australian drama films
Australian drama television series
World War II television drama series
1984 drama films
Australian World War II films
Films set in the Australian Capital Territory
1980s Australian television miniseries
1984 Australian television series debuts
1984 Australian television series endings
1984 television films
Films directed by Chris Thomson (director)
1980s English-language films